Juventus F.C. did not manage to win the domestic championship for the seventh year in succession, but the legacy of the season was saved when it beat Borussia Dortmund by 3–1 away from home, then 3–0 in Turin, to clinch the 1992–93 edition of the UEFA Cup.

Prior to the season, Juventus had bought Andreas Möller and Gianluca Vialli for multi-million £ fees. Vialli was considered a disappointment relative to his Sampdoria form, but Möller quickly established himself as a key midfielder and easily came to terms with the Italian game. The third big-money signing David Platt from relegated Bari, spent his season mostly injured, and was sold to Sampdoria at the end of it. Roberto Baggio was the club topscorer for the third successive season, scoring 21 goals, despite being used as a trequartista, playing just behind the forwards.

Squad

Transfers

Competitions

Serie A

League table

Results by round

Matches

Top scorers
  Roberto Baggio – 21 (3)
  Andreas Möller – 10
  Gianluca Vialli – 6
  Fabrizio Ravanelli – 5 (1)
  Paolo Di Canio – 3
 David Platt – 3

Coppa Italia 

Second round

Eightfinals

Quarterfinals

Semifinals

UEFA Cup

First round

Second round

Third round

Quarter-finals

Semi-finals

Final

Statistics

Players Statistics

References

Juventus F.C. seasons
Juventus
UEFA Europa League-winning seasons